The Adelaide Plains (Kaurna name Tarndanya) is a plain in South Australia lying between the coast (Gulf St Vincent) on the west and the Mount Lofty Ranges on the east. The southernmost tip of the plain is in the southern seaside suburbs of Adelaide around Brighton at the foot of the O'Halloran Hill escarpment with the south Hummocks Range and Wakefield River roughly approximating the northern boundary.

Traditionally entirely occupied by the Kaurna (indigenous) people, the Adelaide Plains are crossed by a number of rivers and creeks, but several dry up during summer. The rivers (from south to north) include: the Onkaparinga/Ngangki, Sturt/Warri Torrens/Karra Wirra, Little Para, Gawler, Light/Yarralinka and Wakefield/Undalya.

The plain can be roughly divided into three parts. The southern area is now covered by the city of Adelaide, the capital of South Australia. The central area is considered the breadbasket of South Australia with many market gardens and wineries, particularly around the towns of Virginia and Angle Vale. The northern area is predominantly used for growing cereal grains such as wheat, barley, and canola, and farming sheep.

Usage of the term Adelaide Plains frequently refers to a central and non-metropolitan subset of the plain. This is evidenced by the local government area of  Adelaide Plains Council, which occupies  from the Gawler River in the south to Wild Horse Plains, Long Plains and Grace Plains north of Dublin and Mallala.

See also
Adelaide Plains Football League
Adelaide Plains wine region
Temperate Grassland of South Australia

References

External links
Adelaide and Adelaide Plains Wine Region official tourism page
Wine Diva - Adelaide Plains